3789 Zhongguo, provisional designation , is a resonant asteroid from outermost region of the asteroid belt, approximately  in diameter. It was discovered in 1928 by Chinese astronomer Zhang Yuzhe at the Yerkes Observatory in Williams Bay, Wisconsin, in the United States. Originally named "China", the asteroid became lost and its name was transferred to another asteroid. After its re-discovery in 1986, it was named Zhongguo, which is the Chinese word for "China". The T/Xk-type asteroid is the namesake of the resonant Zhongguo group, located in the asteroid belt's Hecuba gap. It has a short rotation period of 3.8 hours.

Discovery and re-discovery 

While studying in Chicago, Chinese astronomer Zhang Yuzhe observed an unknown asteroid, provisionally designated  for the first time on 25 October 1928. After it was (prematurely) given the number 1125, he named it "China" or "中国" (Zhōngguó) in honor of his native country. As it was not observed beyond its initial appearance, a precise orbit could not be calculated, and as a consequence, it became a lost asteroid.

In 1957, the Purple Mountain Observatory in China discovered another asteroid, . With the consent of Zhang Yuzhe, the designation 1125 China was transferred from  the 1928-lost asteroid to this newly discovered one. However, in August 1986, the newly observed object  was identified as the rediscovery of the originally lost asteroid. On 31 May 1988 its official name Zhongguo was published by the Minor Planet Center.

Orbit and classification 

Zhongguo is a non-family asteroid from the main belt's background population. It orbits the Sun in the outer main-belt at a distance of 2.7–3.9 AU once every 5 years and 11 months (2,175 days; semi-major axis of 3.29 AU). Its orbit has an eccentricity of 0.18 and an inclination of 3° with respect to the ecliptic. The body's observation arc begins at Williams Bay in November 1928, eleven days after its official discovery observation.

Zhongguo group 

It is also the namesake of the Zhongguo asteroids, a dynamical group with rather stable orbits. The group is located in the Hecuba gap – one of the largest Kirkwood gaps in the main belt at 3.27 AU – and stays in a 2:1 mean motion resonance with the gas giant Jupiter. It occupies a similar proper element space as the Griqua asteroids. Both the Zhongguos and Griquas mark the outer rim of the asteroid belt. Further out are the Cybele asteroids, which are sometimes described as the "last outpost" of the asteroid belt. They are followed in turn by the resonant Hilda asteroids (3:2) and Jupiter trojans (1:1).

Physical characteristics 

Zhongguo is classified as a T-type and X/k-subtype in the Tholen- and SMASS-like taxonomy of the Small Solar System Objects Spectroscopic Survey (S3OS2), respectively.

Diameter and albedo 

According to the survey carried out by the NEOWISE mission of NASA's Wide-field Infrared Survey Explorer, Zhongguo measures 14.01 kilometers in diameter and its surface has an albedo of 0.099, while the Collaborative Asteroid Lightcurve Link assumes a standard albedo for a carbonaceous asteroidof 0.057 and calculates a diameter of 12.71 kilometers based on an absolute magnitude of 13.21.

Rotation period 

In January 2012, a rotational lightcurve of Zhongguo obtained from photometric observations by astronomers at the Palomar Transient Factory in California. It gave a rotation period of  hours with a brightness amplitude of 0.24 magnitude.

References

External links 
 Asteroid Lightcurve Database (LCDB), query form (info )
 Dictionary of Minor Planet Names, Google books
 Discovery Circumstances: Numbered Minor Planets (1)-(5000) – Minor Planet Center
 
 

003789
003789
Named minor planets
19281025